Jayme Guilherme Caetano Braun (Bossoroca, January 30, 1924 – Porto Alegre, July 8, 1999) was a Brazilian folk musician, poet and composer .

Jayme was the most famous payador of Rio Grande do Sul and had great participation in the dissemination of the gaúcho culture in Brazil and the world. Between 1973 and 1988, he had a weekly radio program on Radio Guaíba.

Bibliography
1954 - Galpão de Estância
1958 - De Fogão em Fogão
1965 - Potreiro de Guaxos
1966 - Bota de Garrão
1966 - Brasil Grande do Sul
1966 - Passagens Perdidas
1990 - Payador e Troveiro
1996 - 50 Anos de Poesia

Discography
1993 - Paisagens Perdidas
1993 - Poemas Gaúchos

1924 births
1999 deaths
Brazilian composers
20th-century Brazilian male singers
20th-century Brazilian singers
Brazilian people of German descent
Culture in Rio Grande do Sul
People from Rio Grande do Sul
20th-century composers